Elaine Crowley (born 18 August 1977) is an Irish journalist, presenter and newsreader, best known for presenting Midday from 2010 to 2016 and  Elaine from 2016 to 2021. Since September 2021 she has been a Co-host on  Ireland AM

Career
Crowley studied at Dublin Institute of Technology before joining TV3 in 2000. She was a newsreader and a presenter on morning talk show Ireland AM before headlining panel show Midday from 2010 to 2016.

Personal life
Crowley is the youngest of ten. She is in a long term relationship. Crowley has been open about her struggles with her weight and body image, and with clinical depression.
In 2016, she took part in Celebrity Operation Transformation on RTÉ One.

References

External links
 

1977 births
Living people
Virgin Media News newsreaders and journalists
Alumni of Dublin Institute of Technology
People from County Cork